The Adam Spach Rock House Site is a historic archaeological site in Davidson County, North Carolina.  Located near the community of Friedberg, it consists of the ruins of a stone house built in 1774 by Adam Spach, founder of the Friedberg Moravian Church.  Spach, who came to the area in 1754, supposedly built the house as a fortified defense against attacks from local Native Americans, setting it on top of a spring to provide a regular water source.

The site was listed on the National Register of Historic Places in 2002.

See also
National Register of Historic Places listings in Davidson County, North Carolina

References

Archaeological sites on the National Register of Historic Places in North Carolina
Houses completed in 1754
Buildings and structures in Davidson County, North Carolina
National Register of Historic Places in Davidson County, North Carolina